Marano di Valpolicella is a comune (municipality) in the Province of Verona in the Italian region Veneto, located about  west of Venice and about  northwest of Verona.

The municipality of Marano di Valpolicella contains the frazione (subdivision) Valgatara e San Rocco.

Marano di Valpolicella borders the following municipalities: Fumane, Negrar, San Pietro in Cariano, and Sant'Anna d'Alfaedo.

Art

Demographic evolution

Twin towns
Marano di Valpolicella is twinned with:

  Appenheim, Germany, since 2003

References

External links
 Municipality web site
 www.maranovalpolicella.it

Cities and towns in Veneto